Listed below are the dates and results for the 1998 FIFA World Cup qualification rounds for the South American zone (CONMEBOL). For an overview of the qualification rounds, see the article 1998 FIFA World Cup qualification.

A total of 10 CONMEBOL teams entered the competition. The South American zone was allocated 5 places (out of 32) in the final tournament. Brazil, the defending champions, qualified automatically, leaving 4 spots open for competition between 9 teams.

This was the first World Cup qualifying competition to involve all of the yet-unqualified teams in the confederation playing against each other home and away to decide places in the tournament, a format that was replicated for subsequent World Cup qualifying competitions between CONMEBOL members.

Final standings

Argentina, Paraguay, Colombia and Chile qualified.

Matches

Round 1

Round 2

Round 3

Round 4

Round 5

Round 6

Round 7

Round 8

Round 9

Round 10

Round 11

Round 12

Round 13

Round 14

Round 15

Round 16

Round 17

Round 18

Qualified teams
The following five teams from CONMEBOL qualified for the final tournament.

1 Bold indicates champions for that year. Italic indicates hosts for that year.

Goalscorers
There were 184 goals scored in 72 matches, for an average of 2.56 goals per match.
12 goals

 Iván Zamorano

11 goals

 Marcelo Salas

7 goals

 Faustino Asprilla

6 goals

 Álex Aguinaga
 Ariel Graziani
 Roberto Palacios

4 goals

 Ariel Ortega

3 goals

 Gabriel Batistuta
 Hernán Crespo
 Marco Etcheverry
 Marco Sandy
 Antony de Ávila
 Carlos Valderrama
 Eduardo Hurtado
 Miguel Ángel Benítez
 Arístides Rojas
 Marcelo Otero

2 goals

 Marcelo Gallardo
 Claudio López
 Diego Simeone
 Julio Baldivieso
 Jaime Moreno
 Berthy Suárez
 Javier Margas
 Pedro Reyes
 Jorge Bermúdez
 Hamilton Ricard
 Mauricio Serna
 Agustín Delgado
 Carlos Gamarra
 Derlis Soto
 Catalino Rivarola
 Germán Carty
 Juan Reynoso Guzmán
 Julinho
 Flavio Maestri
 José Pereda
 Jorge Soto
 Sebastián Abreu
 Paolo Montero
 Marcelo Saralegui
 Darío Silva
 Giovanni Savarese

1 goal

 José Albornoz
 Fernando Cáceres
 Néstor Gorosito
 Hugo Morales
 Pablo Paz
 Juan Pablo Sorín
 Juan Sebastián Verón
 Ramiro Castillo
 Milton Coimbra
 Luis Cristaldo
 Fernando Ochoaizpur
 Roly Paniagua
 Vladimir Soria
 Rodrigo Barrera
 Juan Carreño López
 Fernando Cornejo
 Fabián Estay
 Pedro González Vera
 Víctor Aristizábal
 Wilmer Cabrera
 Freddy Rincón
 Iván Valenciano
 Cléber Chalá
 José Gavica
 Iván Hurtado
 Alberto Montaño
 Máximo Tenorio
 Roberto Acuña
 Francisco Arce
 Richard Báez
 Hugo Brizuela
 José Cardozo
 José Luis Chilavert
 Julio César Enciso
 Félix Ricardo Torres
 Manuel Marengo
 Carlos Aguilera
 Pablo Bengoechea
 Gabriel Cedrés
 Eber Moas
 Gustavo Poyet
 Álvaro Recoba
 Gonzalo de los Santos
 Rafael Castellín
 Gerson Díaz
 Rafael Dudamel
 Dioni Guerra
 Gabriel Miranda
 Edson Tortolero

1 own goal

 Hugo Galeano (playing against Paraguay)

References

External links
Eliminatoria Sudamericana Mundial Francia 1998 at Conmebol.com
International Matches 1996 – South America at rsssf.com
International Matches 1997 – South America at rsssf.com

CONMEBOL
FIFA World Cup qualification (CONMEBOL)
World
World